Kasganj is a city and the district headquarters of Kasganj district in the Indian state of Uttar Pradesh. The district was formed by grouping three Tehsils at 17 April 2008 .

History
Kasganj, which lies in the historical region of Braj, was also known as 'Khasganj' during Mughal and British period. 
According to 'Imperial Gazetteer of India Vol. XV' (1908) by William Wilson Hunter Kasganj came in the hands of James V. Gardner (who was in the employ of the Marathas and later in the British service) and later died in here in Chhaoni, Kasganj. Before James Gardner, his father Colonel William Linnaeus Gardner was also stationed here. William Gardner built his estate in Kasganj after retiring from army and he also died in Kasganj in July, 1835. William and James Gardner belonged to the lineage of Baron Gardner of Uttoxeter, England. Evidences are that heir to the Barony of Gardner is still living somewhere around Kasganj. Famous writer and historian William Dalrymple also came to Kasganj in search of Julian Gardner, heir to the English Barony, while researching for his book White Mughals. Besides, the book of Fanny Parkes namely 'Wanderings of a Pilgrim in search of the Picturesque' gives details of her visits to Kasganj (then Khasgunge) and her mention of the town and Gardner Family.

An older description mentioned Kasganj as standing on an elevated site, its drainage flowing towards the Kali Nadi(Black Stream) which runs about a mile south east of the town. The town was constituted a municipality in 1868. 
Kasganj set in the midst of the strategic Indo-Gangetic plain figured in military and political vicissitudes of ancient kingdom from the Mahabharata onwards. It formed part of the grand empire of Harshavardhan; and it finds mention in the accounts of the 7th century Chinese pilgrim Hsien Tsang (Xuanzang) who passed this way in 647 A.D.

In near kasganj city there is a village named Atranjikhera where once Lord gautam Buddha kept his anniversary and place is revered as a holy pilgrim place for buddhist. Excavation here began in 1962, which revealed that site was occupied from 1200 B.C to 300 B.C. Various artefacts and ruined structures from ancient town have been found in Atranji Khera Achalpur (CHAUHAN's kingdom). Another village near Kasganj, Jakhera is also a major archaeological excavation site. Iron tools like sickles, hoes, ploughshare and terracotta figurines have been found from Jakhera which dates back to 1000B.C. to 600B.C. giving evidence that Jakhera was a part of Painted Grey Ware culture and Northern Black Polished Ware culture of ancient India. Currently research is going on the collected artefacts. These evidences show that Kasganj has a rich history since ancient and medieval times.
Kasganj was founded by Nawab Yaqoot Ali Khan, a descendant of the Nawabs of Farrukhabad. The city was known as Yaqoot Ganj in the early sixteenth century. The inscription regarding its establishment is still visible in the city's Jama Masjid (big mosque). It is said that the well-protected building at Tehsil Road which houses the tehsil was the residence of Nawab Yaqoot Ali Khan until it was acquired by the British after fall of Awadh. Later the city came into the hands of Kunwar Maharaj Singh Jain, then succeeded by late kunwar Bhartendra singh Jain the only Zamindars of the city.
The city was established here because it represented a centre point in the road connections between various small, ancient cities of District Etah, such as Bilram, Marehra, Etah, Sakeet, Atranji Khera and Aligarh. Kasganj is a city of rich cultural heritage. It is the junction of east, west and south UP, that very much reflects through peoples language, dresses and dishes. Direct impact of Brij Pradesh is very much evident. Hindu-Muslim culture is woven fine here. There is a long history of togetherness of both communities with love and respect to each other. Christians and Sikhs are also indispensable part of the society.

Post-independence

The city was established here because it represented a centre-point in the road connections between various small, ancient cities of District Etah, such as Bilram, Marehra, Etah, Sakeet, Atranji Khera and Aligarh.
It was the junction of east, west and south UP, that very much reflects through people's language, dresses and dishes. Direct impact of Brij Pradesh is very much evident. Hindu-Muslim culture is woven fine here and there is a long history of togetherness of both communities with love and respect to each other. Christians and Sikhs also form an indispensable part of the society.

Geography
It has an average elevation of 177 metres (580 feet).
The kasganj Block is established 26 January 1956. The soron Block is established 02/10/1958.
The patiyali block is established in 02/10/1957.
The Ganjdundwara block is established in 01/04/1959. The Sidhpura block is established in 02/10/1959.
The Sahawar block is established in 01/04/1958.
The Amanpur block is established in 01/04/1960.

Climate
Kasganj features a humid subtropical climate.  Not far from the foothills of the Himalayas, the winters are moderate, with temperature sometimes reaching 5  degrees. The summers are hot and dry, with temperatures regularly exceeding 40 °C. The monsoon season runs from the end of June to September.  During the monsoon season, almost daily showers are not an uncommon phenomenon.  From October onward, the weather is pleasant. Proper winter begins in Late November.

Demographics
As per provisional data of 2011 census, Kasganj had a population of 101,241, out of which males were 53,507 and females were 47,734. The literacy rate was 77.36 per cent. The local languages are Brajbhasha and Kannauji.

Education
Kanshiram Nagar district or Kasganj district has 107 inter colleges (12th college), 27 I.T.I colleges, 39-degree colleges, 7 post graduation colleges and 1 engineering college.

Transport
Kasganj is strategically located and is well connected by road and railway network.  It is situated on State Highway no 33 Agra -Budaun -Bareilly (also known as the Mathura-Barielly highway) and is 30 km away from the Grand Trunk Road, approachable from two places - Etah and Sikandra Rao. It is 114 kms away from Agra and 107 Kms from Mathura and 220 Kms from National Capital via Yamuna Express Way.

Road
These towns are connected to Kasganj by road as well as Railways except Etah which is connected by road only. It is also connected to the capital of India, Delhi through very frequent roadways service. The frequency of road and rail transport to and from Kasganj makes it easily accessible day and night throughout the year.

Soron, also known as 'Soronji' among its devotees mostly from Rajasthan is a small town known for its religious significance. It is located only 15 km from Kasganj. Since the construction of the road bridge on the 'Gangaji' it is very convenient to travel toward the Budaun and Bareilly side.

Kachhla, a small settlement on the banks of holy river Ganges, locally known as the Ganga, is only 30 km from Kasganj.

Railways
Kasganj has a well established rail network since the time of British rule. It lies on a trijunction and it is connected to Mathura, Kanpur and Bareilly through rail network in three different direction. Also trains to far away cities like Mumbai, Kolkata, Ahmedabad, Kamakhya etc. are easily available.

References

Cities and towns in Kasganj district
Cities in Uttar Pradesh
Kasganj